Inundation is a term for Flooding. 

Inundation may also refer to:
Flooding of the Nile, regularly referred to as "the Inundation"
Inundation, Gibraltar, flooded and fortified area of ground between Spain and Gibraltar
Inundation of the Wieringermeer
Season of the Inundation first season of the lunar and civil Egyptian calendars